Roche à Bosche is a 2,148 metre mountain summit located at the south end of the Bosche Range in Jasper National Park, in the Canadian Rockies of Alberta, Canada. The peak may be seen from the Jasper House National Historic Site along Highway 16.

Climate

Based on the Köppen climate classification, Roche à Bosche is located in a subarctic climate with cold, snowy winters, and mild summers.

See also
 Mountains of Alberta

References

External links
 Parks Canada web site: Jasper National Park

Roche à Bosche
Alberta's Rockies